Malkaridae is a small family of araneomorph spiders first described by Valerie Todd Davies in 1980. In 2017, the family Pararchaeidae was brought into synonymy with Malkaridae.

Genera

, the World Spider Catalog accepts the following genera:

Anarchaea Rix, 2006 — Australia
Carathea Moran, 1986 — Australia
Chilenodes Platnick & Forster, 1987 — Chile, Argentina
Flavarchaea Rix, 2006 — Australia
Forstrarchaea Rix, 2006 — New Zealand
Malkara Davies, 1980 — Australia
Nanarchaea Rix, 2006 — Australia
Ozarchaea Rix, 2006 — Australia, New Zealand
Pararchaea Forster, 1955 — New Zealand
Perissopmeros Butler, 1932 — Australia
Westrarchaea Rix, 2006 — Australia
Whakamoke Hormiga & Scharff, 2020 — New Zealand

References

 Platnick, N.I & Forster, R.R (1987). On the first American spiders of the subfamily Sternodinae (Araneae, Malkaridae). American Museum Novitates 2894. PDF 5Mb (Abstract) (Chilenodes)

 
Araneomorphae families
Taxa named by Valerie Todd Davies